This is the order of battle for the ground forces involved in Operation Crusader, a World War II battle between the British Commonwealth and the European Axis Powers of Germany and Italy in North Africa between 18 November – 30 December 1941.

British and Commonwealth Forces
Commander-in-Chief Middle East Command: General Claude Auchinleck

British Eighth Army
Lieutenant-General Alan Cunningham, succeeded on 26 November by Lieutenant-General Neil Ritchie

XXX Corps
Lieutenant-General Willoughby Norrie
 7th Armoured Division (Major-General William Gott)
 4th Armoured Brigade
 8th Hussars
 3rd Royal Tank Regiment
 5th Royal Tank Regiment
 2nd Battalion, Scots Guards
 2nd Regiment, Royal Horse Artillery
 7th Armoured Brigade
 7th Hussars
 2nd Royal Tank Regiment
 6th Royal Tank Regiment
 22nd Armoured Brigade
 2nd Royal Gloucestershire Hussars
 3rd County of London Yeomanry (Sharpshooters)
 4th County of London Yeomanry (Sharpshooters)
 7th Support Group
 3rd Regiment, Royal Horse Artillery
 4th Regiment, Royal Horse Artillery
 1st Battalion, Kings Royal Rifle Corps
 2nd Battalion, Rifle Brigade 
 60th Field Regiment, Royal Artillery
 One Battery, 51st Field Regiment, Royal Artillery
 Divisional troops
 4th South African Armoured Car Regiment
 King's Dragoon Guards
 11th Hussars
 1st Light Anti-Aircraft Regiment, Royal Artillery
 1st South African Division (Major-General George Brink)
 1st South African Infantry Brigade
 1st Battalion, Duke of Edinburgh's Own Rifles, South African Infantry Corps
 1st Battalion, Royal Natal Carabineers, South African Infantry Corps
 1st Battalion, Transvaal Scottish Regiment, South African Infantry Corps
 3rd Field Artillery Regiment, South African Artillery Corps
 5th South African Infantry Brigade
 Regiment Botha, South African Infantry Corps
 South African Irish Regiment, South African Infantry Corps
 3rd Battalion, Transvaal Scottish Regiment, South African Infantry Corps
 4th Field Artillery Regiment, South African Artillery Corps
 22nd Guards Brigade
 9th Battalion, Rifle Brigade
 3rd Battalion, Coldstream Guards

XIII Corps
Lieutenant-General Reade Godwin-Austen
 2nd New Zealand Division (Major-General Bernard Freyberg)
 4th New Zealand Infantry Brigade
 18th Infantry Battalion
 19th Infantry Battalion
 20th Infantry Battalion
 5th New Zealand Infantry Brigade
 21st Infantry Battalion
 22nd Infantry Battalion
 23rd Infantry Battalion
 6th New Zealand Infantry Brigade
 24th Infantry Battalion
 25th Infantry Battalion
 26th Infantry Battalion
 Divisional troops
 27th (Machine Gun) Infantry Battalion
 28th (Maori) Infantry Battalion
 4th Field Regiment
 5th Field Regiment
 6th Field Regiment
 7th Anti-Tank Regiment
 14th Light Anti-Aircraft Regiment
 Divisional Cavalry Regiment
 4th Indian Infantry Division (Major-General Frank Messervy)
 5th Indian Infantry Brigade
 1st Battalion, The Buffs
 3rd Battalion, 1st Punjab Regiment
 4th Battalion (Outram's), 6th Rajputana Rifles
 7th Indian Infantry Brigade
 1st Battalion, Royal Sussex Regiment
 4th Battalion, 11th Sikh Regiment
 4th Battalion, 16th Punjab Regiment
 11th Indian Infantry Brigade
 2nd Battalion, Queen's Own Cameron Highlanders
 2nd Battalion, 5th Mahratta Light Infantry
 1st Battalion (Wellesley's), 6th Rajputana Rifles
 Divisional troops
 The Central India Horse (21st King George V's Own Horse) (Reconnaissance)
 1st Field Regiment, Royal Artillery
 25th Field Regiment, Royal Artillery
 31st Field Regiment, Royal Artillery
 1st Army Tank Brigade
 8th Royal Tank Regiment - Valentine Infantry Tank (Lt Col Brooke)
 42nd Royal Tank Regiment( Lt Col Willison later Lt Col Martin)
 44th Royal Tank Regiment - Matilda Mk II Infantry Tank (Lt Col Yeo)

Tobruk Fortress
Major-General Ronald Scobie
 70th Infantry Division
 14th Infantry Brigade
 1st Battalion, Bedfordshire and Hertfordshire Regiment
 2nd Battalion, Black Watch
 2nd Battalion, York and Lancaster Regiment
 16th Infantry Brigade
 2nd Battalion, King's Own Royal Regiment
 2nd Battalion, Leicestershire Regiment
 2nd Battalion, Queen's Royal Regiment
 23rd Infantry Brigade
 1st Battalion, Durham Light Infantry
 1st Battalion, Essex Regiment
 4th Battalion, Border Regiment
 Polish Independent Carpathian Rifle Brigade
 I Carpathian Rifle Battalion
 II Carpathian Rifle Battalion
 III Carpathian Rifle Battalion
 11 Czechoslovakian Infantry Battalion
 2/13 Australian Infantry Battalion
 Carpathian Machine Gun Battalion
 Carpathian Field Regiment
 32nd Army Tank Brigade (Brigadier A.C. Willison)
 1st Royal Tank Regiment
 4th Royal Tank Regiment
 'D' Squadron 7th Royal Tank Regiment
 4th Anti-Aircraft Brigade (Brigadier John Muirhead)
 69th (Royal Warwickshire Regiment) Heavy Anti-Aircraft Regiment, Royal Artillery
 13th Light Anti-Aircraft Regiment, Royal Artillery
 14th Light Anti-Aircraft Regiment, Royal Artillery
 1 and 5 Independent Light Anti-Aircraft Batteries, Royal Artillery
 306 Battery, 27th (London Electrical Engineers) Searchlight Regiment, Royal Artillery

Oasis Force
Brigadier Denys Reid
 29th Indian Infantry Brigade
 1st Battalion, Worcestershire Regiment
 3rd Battalion, 2nd Punjab Regiment
 1st Battalion, 5th Mahratta Light Infantry
 6th South African Armoured Car Regiment

Army Reserve
 2nd South African Division (Major-General Isaac de Villiers)
 3rd South African Infantry Brigade
 Imperial Light Horse, South African Infantry Corps
 Rand Light Infantry, South African Infantry Corps
 1st Battalion, Royal Durban Light Infantry, South African Infantry Corps
 1st Field Artillery Regiment, South African Artillery Corps
 4th South African Infantry Brigade
 Kaffrarian Rifles, South African Infantry Corps
 Umvoti Mounted Rifles, South African Infantry Corps
 2nd Battalion, Royal Durban Light Infantry, South African Infantry Corps
 2nd Field Artillery Regiment, South African Artillery Corps
 6th South African Infantry Brigade
 1st South African Police Battalion
 2nd South African Police Battalion
 2nd Battalion, Transvaal Scottish Regiment, South African Infantry Corps
 5th Field Artillery Regiment, South African Artillery Corps

German and Italian forces
Supreme Commander North Africa: General Ettore Bastico

Italian XX Corps (Corpo d'Armata di Manovra - Mobile Corps)
Lieutenant-General Gastone Gambara
 Corps assets:
 Three batteries of truck-mounted 102mm AA/AT guns
 132nd Armoured Division "Ariete" (General Mario Balotta)
 32nd Tank Infantry Regiment
 I Light Tank Battalion
 II Light Tank Battalion
 132nd Tank Infantry Regiment
 VII Medium Tank Battalion
 VIII Medium Tank Battalion
 IX Medium Tank Battalion
 8th Bersaglieri Regiment
 132nd Artillery Regiment
 One battalion attached from the 26th Artillery Regiment, 17th Infantry Division "Pavia">
 One battalion attached from the 24th Corps Artillery Group
 101st Motorised Division "Trieste"
 65th Infantry Regiment
 66th Infantry Regiment
 9th Bersaglieri Regiment
 551st Heavy Weapons Battalion
 21st Artillery Regiment
 RECAM (Raggruppamento Esplorante del Corpo d'Armata di Manovra - "reconnaissance group of the mobile army corps")
 III Light Tank Battalion (attached from the 32nd Tank Infantry Regiment, Ariete division)
 LII Medium Tank Battalion
 "Romolo Gessi" Battalion, Italian Africa Police
 "Giovani Fascisti" Infantry Group (2 bns)
 Raggruppamento Batterie Volanti ("Portees" - truck mounted - Artillery Group)

Panzer Group Africa
Panzer Group Africa commanded by General der Panzertruppe Erwin Rommel

German Afrika Korps (commanded by Generalleutnant Ludwig Crüwell)
 15th Panzer Division (Generalmajor Walter Neumann-Silkow until 6 December (killed in action), then Generalmajor Gustav von Vaerst)
 8th Panzer Regiment (2 bns)
 1st Battalion, 115th Infantry Regiment
 2nd Machine Gun Battalion
 3rd Engineers Battalion
 33rd Recon Battalion
 33rd Anti-tank Battalion
 33rd Artillery Regiment
 21st Panzer Division (Generalmajor Johann von Ravenstein until 29 November (prisoner of war), then Generalmajor Karl Böttcher)
 5th Panzer Regiment (2 bns)
 104th Infantry Regiment (2 bns)
 15th Motorcycle Battalion
 3rd Recon Battalion
 200th Engineers Battalion
 39th Anti-Tank Battalion
 605th Anti-Tank Battalion
 155th Artillery Regiment
 Special Purpose Division Afrika (Renamed 90th Light Africa Division from 28 November 1941) (Generalmajor Max Sümmermann until 10 December (killed in action), then Generalmajor Richard Veith)
 2nd Battalion, 115th Infantry Regiment
 155th Infantry Regiment (3 bns)
 3rd Battalion, 255th Infantry Regiment
 3rd Battalion, 347th Infantry Regiment
 361st Infantry Regiment (2 bns)
 900th Engineers Battalion
 580th Recon Battalion
 Elements from the 300th "Oasis" Battalion
 2nd Battalion, 115th Motor Artillery Regiment
 2nd Motor Artillery Regiment (Italian)
 55th Infantry Division "Savona" (General Fedele de Giorgis)
 15th Infantry Regiment
 16th Infantry Regiment
 "Genova Cavalleria" Machine Gun Battalion
 155th Machine Gun Battalion
 Elements, from the 300th "Oasis" Battalion (German)
 12th Artillery Regiment

Italian XXI Corps
Italian XXI Corps commanded by Lieutenant-General Enea Navarini
 Corps assets:
 3rd Motor Artillery Regiment
 16th Corps Artillery Group
 8th Army Artillery Group
 24th Army Artillery Group
 340th Frontier Guards Artillery Group
 340th Frontier Guards Engineers Battalion
 17th Infantry Division "Pavia"
 27th Infantry Regiment
 28th Regiment Pavia
 V Light Tank Battalion
 "Lancieri d'Aosta" Machine Gun Battalion
 17th Heavy Weapons Battalion
 26th Artillery Regiment
 25th Infantry Division "Bologna"
 39th Infantry Regiment
 40th Infantry Regiment
 25th Heavy Weapons Battalion
 205th Artillery Regiment
 27th Infantry Division "Brescia"
 19th Infantry Regiment
 20th Infantry Regiment
 27th Machine Gun Battalion
 1st Motor Artillery Regiment
 102nd Motorised Division "Trento"
 7th Bersaglieri Regiment
 61st Infantry Regiment
 62nd Infantry Regiment
 551st Anti-Tank Battalion
 46th Artillery Regiment

Notes

References
 Gen Sir Martin Farndale, History of the Royal Regiment of Artillery: The Years of Defeat: Europe and North Africa, 1939–1941, Woolwich: Royal Artillery Institution, 1988/London: Brasseys, 1996, .
 
 
 
 
 Brig N.W. Routledge, History of the Royal Regiment of Artillery: Anti-Aircraft Artillery 1914–55, London: Royal Artillery Institution/Brassey's, 1994, 
 
 The North African Campaign 1940–43. B H Liddell Hart

External links
 The Major Ground Commands and Commanders on The CRUSADER Project
 Rats of Tobruk Tribute site

Western Desert campaign
World War II orders of battle